A writ for the election of the 3rd General Assembly of Nova Scotia was issued on February 28, 1761.  The assembly convened on July 1, 1761, held six sessions, and was dissolved on January 30, 1765.

Sessions
Dates of specific sessions are under research.

Governor and Council
Administrator: Jonathan Belcher continued to serve as acting governor until named Lt. Gov.
Governor: Henry Ellis named November 21, 1761, never served, Lt. Governors served in his name.
Lieutenant Governor:
Jonathan Belcher named November 21, 1761
Montague Wilmot named 14 March 1763, arrived September 26, 1763
Governor: Montague Wilmot named May 31, 1764
Lieutenant Governor: vacant?

The members of the Council are currently under research.

House of Assembly

Officers
Speaker of the House: William Nesbitt of Halifax County
Clerk of the House: 
Archibald Hinshelwood of Lunenburg County to 1764.
Isaac Deschamps of Falmouth Township from 1764.

Division of seats
Cumberland County and Cumberland Township lost their 4 seats, and 6 new seats were created for Cornwallis,
Falmouth and Liverpool Townships, for a total of 24 seats.  Onslow and Truro Townships were granted 4 new seats for the second session, for a total of 28.  Truro failed to elect its members.

Members

Annapolis County
Joseph Woodmass
John Steele -seat declared vacant May 4, 1762 due to death.
John Harris -by-election May 6, 1762, took seat June 7, 1762.
Annapolis Township
Joseph Winniett -took seat June 7, 1762.
Thomas Day
Cornwallis Township
Samuel Willoughby -might not have served.  Seat declared vacant April 26, 1762 for non-attendance.
Stephen West -attended, but seat declared vacant April 3, 1764 due to illness.
Cumberland County
not represented
Cumberland Township
not represented
Falmouth Township
Henry Denny Denson
Isaac Deschamps
Halifax County:
William Nesbitt
Michael Francklin -seat declared vacant May 4, 1762, appointed to Council.
John Butler -by-election May 6, 1762, took seat June 7, 1762.
Halifax Township
Malachy Salter
John Burbidge
Jonathan Binney
William Best
Horton Township
William Welch
Lebbeus Harris
Kings County
Robert Denison -resigned April 3, 1764 due to old age.
Charles Morris (1731–1802)
Liverpool Township
Benjamin Gerrish
Nathan Tupper -resigned April 3, 1764, unable to attend.
Lunenburg County
Archibald Hinshelwood
Joseph Pernette
Lunenburg Township
Sebastian Zouberbuhler -appointed to Council October 19, 1763, seat declared vacant April 3, 1764.
Philip Augustus Knaut
Onslow Township -writ for first election August 12, 1761
William Nevil Wolseley -by-election September 7, 1761, took seat by March 24, 1762, seat declared vacant April 3, 1764 for leaving province.
David Cutten -by-election September 7, 1761, seat declared vacant April 3, 1764, never sat.
Truro Township
did not elect its two members

Note:  Unless otherwise noted, members were elected at the general election, and took their seats at the convening of the assembly.  By-elections are special elections held to fill specific vacancies.  When a member is noted as having taking their seat on a certain date, but a by-election isn't noted, the member was elected at the general election but arrived late.

References 

03
1761 in Canada
1762 in Canada
1763 in Canada
1764 in Canada
1765 in Canada
1761 establishments in Nova Scotia
1765 disestablishments in Nova Scotia